John (Yahya) Cooper (24 August 1947 - 9 January 1998) was a British Islamic studies scholar and the E. G. Browne lecturer in Persian at the Faculty of Oriental Studies at the University of Cambridge.

Works
A Manual of Islamic beliefs and practice
 Islam and modernity: Muslim intellectuals respond
 Jāmiʻ al-bayān ʻan taʼwīl āy al-Qurʼān
 La vie berbère par les textes : parlors du sud-ouest marocain (tachelhit)
 The significance of Islamic manuscripts : proceedings of the inaugural conference of al-Furqān Islamic Heritage Foundation 
 Ṭabarī. The commentary on the Qurʼān
 Universal science : an introduction to Islamic metaphysics

References

1947 births
British Islamic studies scholars
1998 deaths
Academics of the University of Cambridge
Alumni of the University of Oxford